Presque Isle is the commercial center and largest city in Aroostook County, Maine, United States. The population was 8,797 at the 2020 Census. The city is home to the University of Maine at Presque Isle, Northern Maine Community College, Husson University Presque Isle, Northern Maine Fairgrounds, The Aroostook Centre Mall, and the Presque Isle International Airport.

Presque Isle is the headquarters of the Aroostook Band of Micmac, a federally recognized tribe.

History
The first European settlers were British Loyalists who reached the area in 1819 hoping to obtain land for lumber. Border disputes between the United States and the United Kingdom over the area, however, made it impossible for pioneers to gain title to the land. In response, the government of the neighboring British colony of New Brunswick (now a Canadian province) gave out patents for pioneers to live on the land but not claim ownership or sell it. By 1825, surveyors traveling along the Aroostook River noted that twenty families lived along it and noted that while agriculture was present, all of the families employed most of their time towards wood production.

The boundary dispute slowed development in the area, but the government of Massachusetts, which governed the territory at the time, saw the territory as theirs and encouraged the development of settlements in northern Maine by offering land grants and mill privileges in the 1820s. The first American to settle in the area was Dennis Fairbanks in 1828 who gained ownership over the land under the provisions set up by Massachusetts and later Maine, which gained statehood in 1820.

Name and incorporation 
Originally known as Fairbanks for its founder Dennis Fairbanks, Presque Isle was settled in 1828 on land that was unknown to be part of British North America (Canada) or the United States. The Aroostook War broke out in 1838 because of boundary disputes between the two countries, which were resolved in 1842 by the Webster-Ashburton Treaty. The township was incorporated from Plantations F, G and H on April 4, 1859, as Presque Isle, derived from the French term for peninsula (presqu'île), as the courses of the Aroostook River and Presque Isle Stream form a peninsula. In 1864, Fairmount Cemetery was established in the south of Presque Isle to accommodate Union soldiers returning from the Civil War. In 1883, the town of Maysville was annexed.

On January 1, 1940, Presque Isle was incorporated as a city.

Industry, agriculture and transportation

Lumbering and early industries
The first industry to form in Presque Isle was the lumber industry. By the 1880s, industry included two lumbermills, a gristmill, a wool carding mill, a furniture factory, a carriage factory and a tinware factory.

Agriculture
During the last 30 years of the 19th century, agriculture became important, and the entire county became noted for its production of potatoes. On October 9, 1851, the first Northern Maine Fair exhibition opened. A starch factory was opened in 1874, providing a ready market for local potatoes. In 1914 the Aroostook Farm was purchased as a Maine Agricultural Experiment Station.

Railroad
In 1881 the New Brunswick Railway created the first rail connection in Presque Isle. The Bangor and Aroostook Railroad arrived in 1895.

Airport
A small airport was established in 1931. It was expanded within the decade and later assumed major military importance. The Presque Isle Air Force Base, in operation between 1941 and 1961, was a major departure point for U.S. fighter planes during World War II and the Korean War due to its relative proximity to Europe. When the base was sold, a piece of it became the Northern Maine Regional Airport. In June 2018, the Northern Maine Regional Airport was renamed Presque Isle International Airport.

Beginning on July 2, 2018, United Airlines began service from the Presque Isle International Airport in Presque Isle, Maine to Newark Liberty International Airport in Newark, New Jersey.  These flights are federally subsidized through the Essential Air Service (EAS) program, and are operated by United Express carrier, GoJet Airlines.

Colleges and universities 
In 1903, the Aroostook State Normal School began offering a two-year teacher preparation program. In 1968, it was renamed the University of Maine at Presque Isle. Northern Maine Technical College was established in 1961, now Northern Maine Community College. The first students entered the college in 1963. Today it serves about 2000 students.

Hospitals 
The first Presque Isle Hospital was established on April 8, 1912. Four physicians were affiliated with the hospital, whose dual aims were to serve the community and to provide a training school for nurses. The building was a white-frame structure, enlarged from a home under construction. The need and demand for the hospital increased so rapidly that in 1921 a new three-story brick hospital was dedicated. This hospital was in operation for nearly four decades, when it, too, proved inadequate. A major fundraising campaign was launched in the late 1950s. After a large donation was given by Mr. and Mrs. W. H. Wildes, the daughter of the late Senator Arthur Gould, the Arthur R. Gould Memorial Hospital was constructed and opened in 1960. The hospital has expanded and been modernized in recent years and in 1981 became a part of The Aroostook Medical Center.

The Double Eagle II 
On August 11, 1978, the Double Eagle II was launched from a Presque Isle field carrying three passengers. It made the first successful transatlantic balloon crossing. In honor of the Double Eagle II, the city holds an annual celebration called The Crown of Maine Balloon Festival. The popular event includes balloon rides, plane tours, amateur photo contests and children's fair rides. Sponsored by the Chamber of Commerce and other local organizations, it is held in late August. The field from which the Double Eagle II lifted off now features a commemorative model balloon.

All American City 
Presque Isle was named an All American City in 1966.

Historic images

Geography and climate
Presque Isle is located at  (46.679321, −68.002166).

Presque Isle is drained by the Aroostook River and Presque Isle Stream (also called Prestile Stream).

Presque Isle has a humid continental climate (Köppen: Dfb) typified by long cold winters and short warm summers.

Government
The City of Presque Isle operates under the council-manager form of government. The current city manager is Martin Puckett.

Demographics

2010 census
As of the census of 2010, there were 9,692 people, 4,201 households, and 2,413 families residing in the city. The racial makeup of the city was 94.5% White, 0.6% African American, 2.4% Native American, 0.9% Asian, 0.2% from other races, and 1.4% from two or more races. Hispanic or Latino of any race were 1.3% of the population.

There were 4,201 households, of which 25.7% had children under the age of 18 living with them, 41.1% were married couples living together, 12.1% had a female householder with no husband present, 4.2% had a male householder with no wife present, and 42.6% were non-families. 34.2% of all households were made up of individuals, and 13.3% had someone living alone who was 65 years of age or older. The average household size was 2.19 and the average family size was 2.78.

The median age in the city was 40.2 years. 19.6% of residents were under the age of 18; 12.4% were between the ages of 18 and 24; 24.1% were from 25 to 44; 27.8% were from 45 to 64; and 16.2% were 65 years of age or older. The gender makeup of the city was 48.2% male and 51.8% female.

2000 census
As of the census of 2000, there were 9,511 people, 3,963 households, and 2,464 families residing in the city. The racial makeup of the city was 95.13% White, 0.36% African American, 2.26% Native American, 0.84% Asian, 0.03% Pacific Islander, 0.17% from other races, and 1.21% from two or more races. Hispanic or Latino of any race were 0.65% of the population.

There were 3,963 households, out of which 28.1% had children under the age of 18 living with them, 47.8% were married couples living together, 11.0% had a female householder with no husband present, and 37.8% were non-families. 31.0% of all households were made up of individuals, and 13.7% had someone living alone who was 65 years of age or older. The average household size was 2.25 and the average family size was 2.82.

In the city, the population was spread out, with 21.6% under the age of 18, 13.1% from 18 to 24, 27.0% from 25 to 44, 22.4% from 45 to 64, and 15.9% who were 65 years of age or older. The median age was 37 years. For every 100 females, there were 91.3 males. For every 100 females age 18 and over, there were 88.2 males.

The median income for a household in the city was $29,325, and the median income for a family was $37,090. Males had a median income of $27,510 versus $19,785 for females. The per capita income for the city was $15,712. About 9.2% of families and 14.5% of the population were below the poverty line, including 16.1% of those under age 18 and 15.2% of those age 65 or over.

Economy

Due to being Aroostook County's largest city, Presque Isle is the retail center for a large number of both American and Canadian towns. The Aroostook Centre Mall became a major shopping center for residents during the 1990s. A Super Walmart center also attracts a large number of shoppers. Agriculture remains a top industry of Presque Isle and the surrounding area, with potatoes being the top crop. During the winter months many local businesses rely on the snowmobiling industry as there is a highly regarded trail system connecting far away towns and cities with Presque Isle. Presque Isle is also home to a significant industrial park near the Presque Isle International Airport.

The unemployment rate in Presque Isle is typically somewhat higher than the average across Maine.

Media

Television
Presque Isle is home to one of the smallest TV markets as defined by Nielsen market research. It consists of WAGM-TV channel 8 (a CBS/Fox/CW+ affiliate), sister station WWPI-LD channel 16 (an NBC affiliate which launched on January 7, 2020), and WMEM-TV channel 10 (affiliated with the Maine Public Broadcasting Network ("Maine Public") and PBS). While not part of the Presque Isle TV market, WVII-TV, the ABC affiliate out of Bangor, Maine, airs in Presque Isle, as does NBC affiliate WLBZ.

Radio
Several radio stations have studios located in Presque Isle, including WBPW, WOZI and WQHR, all owned by Townsquare Media. The city is also home to WUPI, the University of Maine Presque Isle's student radio station which broadcasts on 92.1. WMEM 106.1 is Maine Public's radio outlet for the area, affiliated with National Public Radio.

Newspaper
There are no daily newspapers in Aroostook County. The Presque Isle Star-Herald is published Wednesdays, one of several weekly newspapers published in Aroostook County. Others include Caribou's Aroostook Republican, Madawaska's St. John Valley Times, The Fort Fairfield Journal and Houlton's Pioneer Times. The Bangor Daily News has an Aroostook County edition.

Sites of interest

 Aroostook Farm
 Aroostook State Park
 Mark and Emily Turner Memorial Library
 Northern Maine Museum of Science
 Presque Isle Air Museum
 Presque Isle Historical Society & Museum
 Nordic Heritage Center and Ski Trails
 The Maine Solar System Model

In popular culture 
Presque Isle is the focal location for operations in the 1953 film Island in the Sky.

The city is also where Handy McKay retires to open a diner in the Parker novel series by Richard Stark.

Notable people 

 Lucy Hayward Barker, painter
 John Cariani, actor
 John Crowley, author
 Jim Donnelly, state legislator
 James P. Dunleavy, state legislator and Aroostook County Probate Judge
 Jeremy Fischer, state legislator
 Lynn Flewelling, author
 Caroline D. Gentile, associate professor emeritus of education, University of Maine at Presque Isle
 Arthur R. Gould, businessman and U.S. Senator
 James Chico Hernandez, wrestling champion
 John Lisnik, state legislator
 Jessica McClintock, designer
 Gilda E. Nardone, women's employment advocate and nonprofit director
 Ellis Paul, musician
 Robert J. Saucier, veteran and state legislator
 Jack Sepkoski, paleontologist
 Ron Tingley, catcher for several MLB teams
 Alexander Willette, former state legislator
 Michael Willette, state senator
 Gerald Evan Williams, Colonel; World War II Air Force pilot

References

External links

 City of Presque Isle, Maine
 Turner Memorial Library
 Presque Isle Area Chamber of Commerce

 
Cities in Maine
Populated places established in 1828
Cities in Aroostook County, Maine